Hermann auf der Heide (1 June 1911 – 17 October 1984) was a German field hockey player who competed in the 1936 Summer Olympics held in Berlin, Nazi Germany.

He played one match as back for the German field hockey team, which won the silver medal.

References

External links
 

German male field hockey players
Olympic field hockey players of Germany
Field hockey players at the 1936 Summer Olympics
Medalists at the 1936 Summer Olympics
Olympic silver medalists for Germany
Olympic medalists in field hockey
1911 births
1984 deaths
Place of birth missing